Sun Wei is the name of:

 Sun Wei (painter) (9th century), Tang dynasty Chinese painter
 Sun Wei (engineer) (1935–2019), Chinese civil engineer
 Sun Wei (baseball) (born 1976), Chinese baseball player
 Sun Wei (fencer) (born 1992), Chinese fencer
 Sun Wei (gymnast) (born 1995), Chinese gymnast
 , Chinese politician
 Sun Wei (born 1961), Chinese politician
 Wei Sun Christianson (born 1956), Chinese-American businesswoman